Went the Day Well? is a 1942 British war film adapted from a story by Graham Greene and directed by Alberto Cavalcanti. It was produced by Michael Balcon of Ealing Studios and served as unofficial propaganda for the war effort. The film shows a Southern English village taken over by German paratroopers, reflecting the greatest potential nightmare for the British public of the time, although the threat of German invasion had largely receded by that point. The film is notable for its unusually frank, for the time, depiction of ruthless violence.

Plot
The story is told in flashback by a villager (Mervyn Johns). During the Second World War, a group of seemingly authentic British soldiers arrive in the small, fictitious English village of Bramley End. It is the Whitsun weekend, life is even quieter than usual and there is almost no road traffic. At first they are welcomed by the villagers, until doubts set in about their true purpose and identity. After they are revealed to be German soldiers intended to form the vanguard of an invasion of Britain, they round up the residents and hold them captive in the local church. The vicar is shot while sounding the church bell in alarm. To reach the outside world, many of the villagers take action. Such plans include writing a message on an egg and giving them to the local paper boy for his mother but they are crushed when Mrs Fraser's cousin runs over them.

Mrs Fraser then puts a note in Cousin Maude's pocket but she uses it to wedge her car window; her dog, Edward, then chews it to shreds after it blows onto the back seat. Mrs Collins, the postmistress, manages to kill a German with a hatchet and tries to telephone for help but the girls on the telephone exchange see her light and decide that she can wait. Mrs Collins waits and is killed by another German who walks into the shop. The girl at the exchange then picks up the phone but gets no response. The captive civilians attempt to warn the local Home Guard, but are betrayed by the village squire, who is revealed to be a collaborator with the Germans. Members of the local Home Guard are ambushed and shot by the Germans.

A young boy, George, escapes from the church. He is shot in the leg by a German but manages to alert the British Army. British soldiers arrive and are helped by some of the villagers, including a group of Women's Land Army girls, who have managed to escape, barricade themselves in and arm themselves. They defeat the Germans after a short battle. The squire is shot dead by the vicar's daughter, who discovers his treachery as he attempts to let the Germans into the barricaded house. During the battle, many of the villagers who left to fight are wounded or killed; Mrs Fraser saves the children from a grenade by smothering it and Tom's father is shot in the arm and wrenches his ankle as he falls. The British troops then arrive at Bramley End. The villager retelling the story to the camera shows the Germans' grave in the churchyard and explains proudly "Yes, that's the only bit of England they got".

Cast

 Leslie Banks as Oliver Wilsford, the treacherous squire
 C. V. France as the Reverend Ashton, the vicar
 Valerie Taylor as Nora Ashton, the vicar's daughter
 Marie Lohr as Mrs Fraser
 Basil Sydney as Kommandant Ortler, alias Major Hammond
 David Farrar as Lt. Jung, alias Lt. Maxwell
 Harry Fowler as George Truscott
 Elizabeth Allan as Peggy Pryde (a Land Army Girl)
 Frank Lawton as Tom Sturry
 Thora Hird as Ivy Dawking (a Land Army Girl)
 Muriel George as Mrs Collins, the postmistress
 Patricia Hayes as Daisy
 Mervyn Johns as Charles Sims
 Norman Pierce as Jim Sturry
 Kathleen Boutall as Mrs Sturry
 Hilda Bayley as Cousin Maude
 Edward Rigby as Bill Purvis, the poacher
 Ellis Irving as Harry Drew
 Irene Arnold as Mrs Drew
 Norman Shelley as Bob Owen
 Grace Arnold as Mrs Owen
 Philippa Hiatt as Mrs Bates
 Lillian Ellias as Bridget
 Gerald Moore as Johnnie Wade
 Charles Paton as Harry Brown
 Josephine Middleton as Mrs Carter
 Anthony Pilbeam as Ted Garbett
 Arthur Ridley as Father Owen
 Mavis Villiers as Violet
 Josie Welsford as June
 John Slater as German sergeant
 James Donald as German corporal
 Men of the Gloucestershire Regiment

Production

Writing
The film was based on a short story by the author Graham Greene entitled "The Lieutenant Died Last". The film's title is based on an epitaph written by the classical scholar John Maxwell Edmonds. It originally appeared in The Times on 6 February 1918 entitled "Four Epitaphs".

"Went the day well" also appeared in an unidentified newspaper cutting in a scrapbook now held in the RAF Museum (AC97/127/50), and in a collection of First World War poems collated by Vivien Noakes.

Casting
This was the first significant role of Thora Hird's career, and one of the last for C. V. France.

Filming
Exterior scenes were shot on location in the village of Turville in Buckinghamshire.

It was once known as They Came in Khaki.

Reception
The film reinforced the message that civilians should be vigilant against fifth columnists and that "careless talk costs lives". By the time the film was released the threat of invasion had subsided somewhat but it was still seen as an effective piece of propaganda and its reputation has grown over the years. It has been noted that by opening and closing in a predicted future where not only had the war been won but a (fictitious) full-scale German invasion of Britain defeated and by presenting a scenario where all echelons of British society unite for the common good (the lady of the manor sacrifices herself without hesitation, for example), the film's message was morale-boosting and positive rather than scaremongering. Anthony Quinn, a film critic for The Independent on Sunday, commented in 2010, "It subtly captures an immemorial quality of English rural life—the church, the local gossip, the sense of community—and that streak of native 'pluck' that people believed would see off Hitler".

Legacy
In 2005 it was named as one of the "100 Greatest War Films" in a poll by Britain's Channel 4. The 1975 book, The Eagle Has Landed and the later film use some of the same ideas. In July 2010, StudioCanal and the British Film Institute National Archive released a restoration of the Went the Day Well? to significant critical acclaim. Tom Huddleston of Time Out termed it "jawdroppingly subversive. Cavalcanti establishes, with loving care and the occasional wry wink, the ultimate bucolic English scene, then takes an almost sadistic delight in tearing it to bloody shreds in an orgy of shockingly blunt, matter-of-fact violence". When the restored film opened at Film Forum in New York City in 2011, A. O. Scott of The New York Times called it "undeservedly forgotten... [H]ome-front propaganda has rarely seemed so cutthroat or so cunning".

Home media
The film was released on a Manufactured-on-Demand DVD on 9 July 2015. It was released on Blu-ray in July 2011 by Vintage Classics and subsequently in a set called "Their Finest Hour: 5 British WWII Classics" in March 2020.

See also
 Operation Sea Lion, Germany's planned invasion of Britain in 1940
 The Eagle Has Landed (1975), a novel by Jack Higgins with a similar premise
 The Eagle Has Landed (film), 1976 film adaptation of Higgins' book
 The House at Sea's End (Ruth Galloway,#3), 2010 novel by Elly Griffiths, dealing with a crime that occurred during the time of this film and that may be related to the events the film described

References

Sources
 Houston, Penelope. Went the Day Well? London: BFI, 1992,

External links
 

1942 films
1942 war films
British black-and-white films
British war films
British World War II propaganda films
Ealing Studios films
Fictional invasions of England
Films based on short fiction
Films based on works by Graham Greene
Films directed by Alberto Cavalcanti
Films produced by Michael Balcon
Films scored by William Walton
Films set in 1942
Films set in England
Films set on the home front during World War II
Films shot in England